Kazimierz Kucharski (13 February 1909, in Łukawa – 9 April 1995, in Warsaw) was a Polish track and field athlete. Kucharski competed in the men's 800 metres and the 4 × 400 metres relay for Poland at the 1936 Summer Olympics.

External links
Olympic profile

1909 births
1995 deaths
Olympic athletes of Poland
Athletes (track and field) at the 1936 Summer Olympics
Polish male middle-distance runners
People from Sandomierz County
Sportspeople from Świętokrzyskie Voivodeship
Jagiellonia Białystok athletes
20th-century Polish people